La Mesa is a census-designated place and unincorporated community in Doña Ana County, New Mexico, United States. Its population was 728 as of the 2010 census. La Mesa has a post office with ZIP code 88044. NM 28 passes through the community.

Demographics

References

Census-designated places in New Mexico
Census-designated places in Doña Ana County, New Mexico
New Mexico populated places on the Rio Grande